Moerarchis inconcisella is a moth of the family Tineidae. It is found in eastern Australia.

The wingspan is about 20 mm.

The larvae feed on the bark or wood of the rotting logs they live in.

References

Moths of Australia
Myrmecozelinae
Moths described in 1805